Rhys Llywelyn Isaac (20 November 1937 – 6 October 2010) was a South African-born Australian historian of American history who also worked in the United States.

Isaac and his twin brother Glynn were born in Cape Town, South Africa, to William Edwyn Isaac and Frances Margaret Leighton, both professional botanists.

Isaac earned his B.A. and M.A. degrees from the University of Cape Town.  In 1959 he was the Cape Province Rhodes Scholar at Balliol College (Oxford), earning his Ph.D. in 1962.

In 1963 Isaac emigrated to Australia, where he taught at the University of Melbourne, and later at La Trobe University (1971–91), where he was emeritus professor of American history.  In 1975 he was a distinguished visiting professor of early American history at the College of William & Mary in Williamsburg, Virginia.

Isaac won the 1983 Pulitzer Prize for History for his book The Transformation of Virginia, 1740-1790 (1982), becoming the first and only Australian historian to win a Pulitzer Prize.

In 2004 Isaac published Landon Carter's Uneasy Kingdom: Revolution and Rebellion on a Virginia Plantation, which made use of the exemplary diary of a Virginian landholder and member of the House of Burgesses.

Death
Isaac died at his home in Blairgowrie, Victoria, Australia, on 6 October 2010, aged 72, from cancer.

References

1937 births
People from Cape Town
2010 deaths
20th-century South African historians
Colony of Virginia
Historians of the American Revolution
Historians of the Southern United States
History of the Thirteen Colonies
Historians of the United States
Academic staff of La Trobe University
College of William & Mary faculty
Pulitzer Prize for History winners
Deaths from cancer in Victoria (Australia)
20th-century Australian historians
21st-century American historians
21st-century American male writers
American male non-fiction writers